Data General Extended BASIC, also widely known as Nova Extended BASIC, was a BASIC programming language interpreter for the Data General Nova series minicomputers. It was based on the seminal Dartmouth BASIC, including the Fifth Edition's string variables and powerful  commands for matrix manipulation. In contrast to the compile-and-go Dartmouth BASIC, Extended BASIC was an interpreter.

To this, Extended BASIC added substring manipulation using array slicing, which was common on BASICs of the era, found on HP Time-Shared BASIC, Sinclair BASIC, Atari BASIC and others. This contrasts with the Microsoft BASIC style which uses string functions like , and thus makes porting string code somewhat difficult.

Data General later purchased rights to a much-expanded BASIC which was released as Data General Business Basic. This added powerful database functionality and largely replaced Extended BASIC on DG platforms.

Description

Mathematics
The internal floating point number format normally used two 16-bit words for a total of 32-bits, stored least significant bit first. Bit 0 was the sign, 1 through 7 was the exponent stored in excess-64 format, and 8 through 31 the mantissa stored as hexadecimal digits. Numbers could alternately use a double-precision format that extended the mantissa only, adding another 32-bits. That meant the double-precision format did not extend the range of numbers that could be stored, only the accuracy of those numbers. Possible numbers ranged from 5.4 to −7.2. Numbers with less than six digits were displayed as decimals, while those with more were displayed in exponent format.

Variable names could consist of a single letter, or a letter and a single digit. Two-letter names were not allowed. Arrays could be med in 1 (array) or 2 (matrix) dimensions, and the lower bound was always 1. As was common at the time, variables with no  defaulted to a 1-D array of 10 elements. Confusingly, if a variable was ed, it was not the same as a variable with the same name that had not been ed;  and  might be the same or different variables depending on how they were created.

Mathematics operators were the standard set, with the addition of a unary plus. Relational operators for comparisons were also the standard set, there was no  for not-equals as found in some contemporary BASICs.

Matrix math
Extended BASIC added the suite of matrix math operations from Dartmouth BASIC's Fifth Edition. These were, in essence, macros that performed operations that would otherwise be accomplished with  loops.

Most mathematical operations were supported, for instance,  multiplies every element in A by 2.  takes the determinant, and  inverts it.

Strings
String literals (constants) were entered between double-quotes. Characters within strings could be escaped by placing their ASCII value between angle-brackets, for instance,  String variables, like their numeric counterparts, consisted of only a single letter, or one letter and one digit.

As is the case for all variables in Extended BASIC, string variables were normally allocated ten spaces, but could be extended up to a maximum of 32 k with an explicit . Because the array syntax was used to declare the length of the string, string arrays were not possible. Assigning a string to a variable that was too small too hold it resulted in any excess being truncated.

String manipulation was carried out using array slicing syntax.  referred to the substring from position 10 to the end of the string, while  referred to characters 10 through 20.

This syntax change was because Extended BASIC allowed math operators to be applied to strings, up to the first non-numeric character. For instance,  would put 3579 into A, without the need to explicitly convert them to numerics, normally handled with the  function in most dialects. Non-numerics were simply ignored,  put 1234 into A.

Extended BASIC lacked the  command from Dartmouth that converted an entire string to or from ASCII values in an array, for instance,  which results in B being assigned 10 numbers, each one an ASCII value.

Statements
Extended BASIC is otherwise similar to Dartmouth and Microsoft BASIC in the variety of commands it supports and their syntax.

Extended BASIC added a variety of immediate mode editing statements that are not really part of the language per se.

Functions
Functions closely matched Dartmouth and Microsoft BASIC, with a few additions.  returned a numeric value encoding the positions of the front-panel switches.  returned whether or not file  had reached the end-of-file.  returned the position of  within , anywhere after the optional position , similar to the MS-standard . Note that this overrides the  found in MS, which returns the current column position of the cursor.

References

Citations

Bibliography
 

BASIC interpreters
BASIC programming language family